Battle of Kumai (Indonesian: Pertempuran Kumai) or also known locally as Battle of 14 January (Indonesian: Pertempuran 14 Januari) was a clash between Netherlands Indies Civil Administration and Royal Netherlands East Indies Army against Indonesian militias in town of Kumai, Central Kalimantan. Indonesian militias, consisted of mostly pemuda (youths), newly formed Indonesian Army, and armed Islamic cleric militia; known as Barisan Ulama (Ulema Front) or Barisan Berjenggot (Bearded Front), confronted Dutch armed convoys that tried to land in the port.

The convoy with strength of around 250, was shot from harbour by militias before made a landing, preventing them to do so. As the result, 50 Dutch soldiers died while 21 recorded also died from Republican side, and the convoy was diverted away from the town.

The battle was reported by delegation of Indonesian nationalist from Borneo in militia commander meeting in Yogyakarta, 21 February 1946. From those delegations are from Laskar Kalimantan (lit: Kalimantan Troops) and also from Barisan Ulema.

Legacy 
The battle is commemorated every year by local government and locals from the town. A road in the town is named Jalan Gerilya, means "Guerilla Street", commemorating the battle. A monument, named Monumen Merah Putih (Red and White Monument) was built in the town with mural depicting soldiers on walls surrounding it.

References 

1946 in Indonesia
1946 in military history
Indonesian National Revolution
Battles of the Indonesian National Revolution
History of Borneo